American University of Iraq, Sulaimani (AUIS) (Arabic: الجامعة الأمريكية في العراق، السليمانية) is a not-for-profit, private institution for public benefit, located in Sulaymaniyah, in the Kurdistan Region of Iraq. The university offers an American-style liberal arts education to students from various economic, ethnic and religious backgrounds.

History
American University of Iraq, Sulaimani was founded in 2006 by a Board of Trustees as an institution dedicated to offering a comprehensive, American-style education in Iraq. The university, modeled after the famous private universities in Cairo and Beirut, was created amid the turmoil of war but in the relatively secure Kurdish region of Iraq. The purpose of founding such a university, according to Dr. Barham Salih was to stimulate reform in the Iraqi education system.

Intellectuals such as Kanan Makiya, Fouad Ajami, and John Agresto, supported the establishment of AUIS. Joshua Mitchell, professor of political theory at Georgetown University became Acting Chancellor in 2008 and remained in his position for two years while on leave from Georgetown.  From 2010 to 2013, Athanasios Moulakis served as Acting President and held the title of President Emeritus of the university. In May 2013, the Board of Trustees chose Dawn Dekle as president. She became the first female president of an Iraqi university when she took up her position at AUIS. Esther Mulnix was chosen to serve as interim president after Dekle's departure. Bruce Walker Ferguson was named President of AUIS on August 1, 2016.

Campus

The main campus has 169-hectares of land situated on the Sulaimani-Kirkuk Road, opposite the University of Sulaymaniyah. Construction of the campus was completed at the start of the academic year in 2011. The campus has several buildings, including an administrative building with a multipurpose conference hall, an academic building, state-of-the-art science labs, a gym, male and female dormitories, as well as two basketball courts and one soccer field. The AUIS library is located in the academic building while its cafeteria is housed in the administrative building. AUIS is currently located just outside the city limits of Sulaymaniyah. The AUIS academic building opened in October 2011 while its administrative building opened in the spring semester of 2012. Moreover, the new student dorm facilities opened in November 2012.

Former campus
AUIS was first located in a temporary campus in the heart of Sulaymaniyah. The campus consisted of about 50 temporary classrooms and offices built near a main administrative building, which housed the university's cafeteria, library, and several large classrooms.

Organization
The university has a board of trustees composed of prominent Iraqi and American leaders from across a wide range of sectors, including government, business, nonprofit and education sectors. The Board of Trustees oversees the management and operations of the university and is a self-perpetuating body that establishes it policies.

Academia

Academic Preparatory Program
The Academic Preparatory Program (APP) prepares non-native English speaking high school graduates to undertake undergraduate studies at AUIS. In addition to English Language skills, they teach critical thinking and study habits. APP ensures that students have the necessary proficiency in English reading, speaking and writing along with awareness of academic cultural norms and expectations to succeed in their undergraduates studies at AUIS.

Undergraduate program
The Undergraduate program at AUIS is modeled after the liberal American-style of education and includes 13 different majors. AUIS undergraduates explore different disciplines before choosing a major. The six different departments at AUIS include the Departments of Business Administration, Engineering, English and Journalism, Information Technology, Social Sciences, Software Engineering, Mathematics and Natural Sciences, and Medical Sciences. Students also have the option of pursuing a secondary course of study in addition to their degree program.

Graduate programs
AUIS offers an Executive MBA program through its Business and Administration Department.

Professional Development Institute
The Professional Development Institute (PDI) at AUIS complements the educational objectives of the university by providing opportunities for lifelong learning through programs and services that enable participants to develop the knowledge and skills necessary to achieve personal and professional goals, improve the productivity of organizations, and provide leadership and service to their communities. PDI is a certified Cisco Academy and is accredited by the Association of Chartered Certified Account, the Project Management Institute, and ICDL. PDI has also been certified as a PMI Registered Education Provider.

Student life and culture

AUIS provides a thriving and vibrant culture of extracurricular activities and sports on campus. Students can take part in many activities including drama, debate, linguistics, music, athletics, social work and indoor games like chess. There are several clubs and societies as well as sports and athletic teams for both men and women at AUIS. Throughout the year, these clubs and societies arrange events and meet to engage more students in creative, extracurricular initiatives. The university frequently takes part in arranging cultural events outside the campus as well. In 2013, the Drama Club and English Department joined forces to hold The Art of Social Justice - a one-week festival celebrating creative arts. The festival, backed by the US State Department, hosted performances, workshops, discussions and field trips by renowned American and Iraqi artists. Later, AUIS senior lecturer Marie Labrosse published a book, SoJust, that chronicled the arts festival in Sulaimani.

The university has also held events and performances at important cultural landmarks like the Cultural Cafe and Chai Xana Sha’ab, in keeping with the strong traditions of the Sulaymaniyah, which is the cultural capital of Kurdistan. It has also held various poetry recitations, like the Poetry Slam, and a poetry workshop at Koç University in Istanbul. AUIS students are generally very active in volunteer and social work. They regularly lead charity drives, cook-offs, and international donation initiatives to help the displaced persons and refugees from Iraq and Syria, in partnership with organizations like Kurdistan Kurdistan Save the Children. Most of these initiatives are led by students independently. Startup Weekend Slemani and Hackasuly are other independent initiatives pioneered predominantly by talented AUIS alumni. The popular events bring together professionals and young entrepreneurs to encourage startup companies and businesses in the region.

Clubs and societies
Several clubs and societies at AUIS allow students with similar interests to mingle with each other, and hone their extracurricular skills. The student organizations vary from developing professional skills like IT and business; to creative arts like anime, drama, music, debate, and literature; to indoor games like chess; as well as sports, hiking and cycling. The AUIS drama club produces plays and dramas throughout the year. Some of their productions include “Twelve Angry (Wo)men”, “Noor”, “Will’s Cafe” - a play to celebrate Shakespeare's 450th birthday; and “The Arranged” - a commentary on the tradition of arranged marriages also written by a student Mahdi Murad, and “9 Parts of Desire” - performed during the Art of Social Justice Festival focusing on Iraqi migrant women. In December 2015, two AUIS students, Leah Farooq and Beyan Tahir, were selected to participate in the Home Grown program - an intensive theatrical training provided jointly by the Kevin Spacey Foundation and The Middle East Theatre Academy. The students were part of a troupe of 35 talented young people scouted from all over the Middle East for the workshop. Both participants selected from Iraq were students at AUIS. The workshop culminated in a theatrical performance in Sharjah on January 25, 2015.  AUIS also hosts the offices of the first independent, English language, student newspaper in Iraq, The AUIS Voice. The AUIS Voice  is run by an editorial board composed solely of students. The Washington Post included two pictures of the AUIS Voice staff in a photo collection titled “Youths in Iraq: The War Generation.” The outlet is also a member of the Associated Collegiate Press. The editorial board selects new editors in the beginning of the fall semester, and the paper is regularly published throughout the fall and spring semester.

Athletics
Student at AUIS, both men and women, are active in sports. The university has two basketball courts and one football field on campus. The official mascot for the athletics teams is the Eagle, and the teams include men's and women's basketball and football. The teams play intercollegiate as well as intramural matches at AUIS, and have also been on international tours. Students on both the women's and men's basketball team at AUIS participated in the 34th Annual Sports Fest at Boğaziçi University in 2014. In 2011, a documentary made by an American film company gained international recognition for the women's basketball team. The film, Salaam Dunk, was shown at several international film festivals including the Chicago International Film Festival and Los Angeles Film Festival.

Institute of Regional and International Studies
AUIS houses Sulaymaniyah's independent research center, the Institute of Regional and International Studies (IRIS). The center focuses on the local, regional, and international, social and political issues through research, scholarships, debate and conferences. According to the university website, the Institute “examines the region’s most complex issues through rigorous scholarship, advanced research, and open dialogue among academic and influential public leaders.” The center conducts meetings, round-tables, conferences and lectures on topics pertinent to the local and regional politics. It invites leading figures from the government, political parties, businesses, historical and cultural institutions to have meaningful dialogues on issues and challenges pertinent to the region. Housed in a tolerant and diverse institution, IRIS provides a neutral space for open and critical dialogue on challenging topics. The center runs one of the most strategic conferences, the Sulaimani Forum, which has rapidly gained recognition throughout the region.

Sulaimani Forum
The Sulaimani Forum is an annual forum to open dialogue and debate on the challenging regional political issues concerning the Middle East. The Forum is held in March every year and focuses on the most pressing local and regional issues through in-depth panel discussions and debates. The Forum invites prominent speakers and specialists on topics from both within Iraq, the wider region, and Europe and the United States. The Forum is covered extensively by the local and international media. During the inaugural Forum in 2013, the event trended on Twitter with #SulaimaniForum in Egypt and Iraq. The event explored the changing dynamics of the Middle East and created a very open debate on issues such as Iraq's internal and external relations, oil, security, Kurdistan and the Arab Spring, etc. The speakers and panelists included distinguished names such as Hoshyar Zebari, Zalmay Khalilzad, and Max Rodenbeck among others. “For an Iraqi Kurd and someone who has attended many such events around the world, the Sulaimani Forum provided the most relevant discussions on Iraq, its politics and future,” reviewed Kurdish journalist and commentator Hiwa Osman on his blog. The second Sulaimani Forum, “Navigating Challenges in the Middle East” brought together experts from around the region on 4–5 March 2014.  The list of speakers included Nechirvan Barzani, Prime Minister of the KRG, who gave a speech at the forum. Others included Hoshyar Zebari, Ahmet Davutoğlu, Zalmay Khalilzad, Falah Al Fayad and Bernard Kouchner.  This Forum was also covered extensively by several media and publications. “While its unofficial epithet, The Davos of the Middle East, may be ambitious, the 2014 Sulaimani Forum, hosted by the American University of Iraq, Sulaimani (AUIS) on March 4th and 5th, was not far off the mark—especially considering that this year’s annual Forum was only the second of its kind,” reviewed the Invest In Group, covering the highlights of the Forum.

Subsequent Forums have been held in 2015, 2016, 2017, and 2019. The seventh Sulaimani Forum is scheduled to take place March 10–11, 2022.

See also

 Private Universities in Iraq
 Salaam Dunk, 2011 documentary about the university's women basketball program
AUC Press
Cairo International Model United Nations
American University of Baghdad (AUIB)
American University of Sharjah (AUS)
American University of Beirut (AUB)
American University in Dubai (AUD)

References

External links
 Official Website
 
 
"An American University for Iraq but Not in Baghdad" The New York Times, January 3, 2007

Sulaymaniyah
Universities in Kurdistan Region (Iraq)
Private universities and colleges
Educational institutions established in 2007
2007 establishments in Iraqi Kurdistan